Third-seeded Nicola Pietrangeli defeated Ian Vermaak 3–6, 6–3, 6–4, 6–1 in the final to win the men's singles tennis title at the 1959 French Championships.

Seeds
The seeded players are listed below. Nicola Pietrangeli is the champion; others show the round in which they were eliminated.

  Luis Ayala (semifinals)
  Neale Fraser (semifinals)
  Nicola Pietrangeli (champion)
  Ian Vermaak (final)
  Jacques Brichant (quarterfinals)
  Pierre Darmon (first round)
  Jon Douglas (third round)
  Budge Patty (third round)
  Roy Emerson (quarterfinals)
  Jaroslav Drobný (fourth round)
  Billy Knight (quarterfinals)
  Orlando Sirola (third round)
  Rod Laver (third round)
  Martin Mulligan (quarterfinals)
  Lew Gerrard (fourth round)
  Giuseppe Merlo (fourth round)

Draw

Key
 Q = Qualifier
 WC = Wild card
 LL = Lucky loser
 r = Retired

Finals

Earlier rounds

Section 1

Section 2

Section 3

Section 4

Section 5

Section 6

Section 7

Section 8

External links
   on the French Open website

1959
1959 in French tennis